The 1997 Iowa Hawkeyes football team represented the University of Iowa in the 1997 Big Ten Conference football season. They participated as members of the Big Ten Conference. The Hawkeyes played their home games at Kinnick Stadium and were led by coach Hayden Fry.

Schedule

Roster

Rankings

Game summaries

Northern Iowa

Sources: Box score and Game recap

Tulsa

Sources: Box score and Game recap

Avenging an upset loss from the previous season, the Hawkeyes rolled up over 600 yards of total offense for the second time in as many games. Senior running back Tavian Banks rushed for a school record 314 yards and a school record-tying 4 touchdowns.

Iowa State

Sources: Box score

The Hawkeyes won against the rival Cyclones for the 15th consecutive year. Tavian Banks had four rushing touchdowns for the second week in a row and Tim Dwight hauled in three touchdown receptions as the Hawkeyes rolled up 575 yards of total offense.

Illinois

Sources: Box score and Game recap

Tavian Banks ran for two more touchdowns to push his total to 12 rushing touchdowns after 4 games. Tony Collins also scored twice, the first on a 61-yard punt return and the other on a 16-yard pass from Matt Sherman.

Ohio State

Sources: Box score and Game recap

College GameDay was in Columbus for this matchup.

Michigan

Sources: Box score and Game recap

Playing their second straight game against a Top 10 team on the road, the Hawkeyes put together a very strong first half. On the final play before the break, Michigan punted to All-American Tim Dwight who took it 61 yards to the house for a 21-7 halftime lead. The Wolverines clamped down in the second half, outscoring Iowa 21-3. Michigan would go on to finish 12-0 and claim the AP National Championship.

Indiana

Sources: Box score and Game recap

The Hawkeyes scored 60+ points for the third time of the 1997 season. The win was highlighted by an electrifying 92-yard punt return for a TD by Tim Dwight. Dwight also caught a 29-yard touchdown from Randy Reiners, who was making his first start at QB, and threw a 64-yard touchdown pass to Damon Gibson. The defense did plenty as well. In addition to pitching a shutout, Matt Bowen and J.P. Lange each added long interception returns for touchdowns.

Purdue

Sources: Box score

Wisconsin

Sources: Box score

The Badgers defeated the Hawkeyes for the first time since the 1976 season.

Northwestern

Sources: Box score

Four missed field goals plagued the Hawkeyes in a road loss to Northwestern.

Minnesota

Sources: Box score

After consecutive disappointing road losses, the Hawkeyes returned to Kinnick Stadium and closed the regular season with a decisive win over the Minnesota Golden Gophers on Senior Day. Late in the 3rd Quarter, Tim Dwight returned a punt 44 yards for a touchdown, giving him the Big Ten record for punt return touchdowns in a career (the record stood until 2006). The Iowa defense posted its third shutout in six home games during the 1997 season.

vs. No. 17 Arizona State (Sun Bowl)

Sources: Box score and Game recap

Postseason awards
Tim Dwight - Consensus first-team All-American (All-purpose / kick returners) and 7th in Heisman Trophy voting.
Jared DeVries - Big Ten Defensive Lineman of the Year

Team players in the 1998 NFL Draft

References

Iowa
Iowa Hawkeyes football seasons
Iowa Hawkeyes football